Andrew Wynter (1819- 12 May 1876, Chiswick) was an English physician and author.

Born in Bristol, Wynter studied medicine at St George's Hospital and set up a London practice.  He edited the British Medical Journal 1845–60, took a M.D. in 1853 and became a member of the College of Physicians in 1861.  Wynter was a frequent contributor to periodicals, including Ainsworth's Magazine, the Cornhill Magazine, Fraser's Magazine, the Edinburgh Review, the Quarterly Review, the London Review, Good Words, and Once a Week.  Many of his contributions were collected and reissued as books.  As a doctor, Wynter specialized in insanity, taking wealthy patients as residents at his Chiswick home.

Works 
 Pictures of Town from my Mental Camera (1855), by 'Werdna Retnyw'
 Odds and Ends from an Old Drawer (1855), by 'Werdna Retnyw'
 Curiosities of Civilisation: being Essays from the Quarterly and Edinburgh Reviews (1860)
 Our Social Bees: Pictures of Town and Country, and other Essays (1861)
 Subtle Brains and Lissom Fingers: being some of the Chisel-Marks of our Industrial and Scientific Progress (1863; 1877 enlarged ed., revised by Andrew Steinmetz)
 Curiosities of Toil (1870)
 Peeps into the Human Hive (1874, 2 vols)
 Fruit between the Leaves (1875, 2 vols)
 The Borderlands of Insanity and other Allied Papers (1875; 1877 enlarged ed., revised by J. M. Granville)

References 
 P. W. J. Bartrip, ‘Wynter, Andrew (1819–1876)’, Oxford Dictionary of National Biography, Oxford University Press, 2004, accessed 11 Sept 2007
 S. A. Allibone, A critical dictionary of English literature, 1859–71

External links
 
 

1819 births
1876 deaths
19th-century English medical doctors
English writers
Medical journal editors